Huité is a municipality in the Guatemalan department of Zacapa.

Municipalities of the Zacapa Department